Molana Safi (also Romanized as Molānā Şafī and Molānā Şofī; also known as Maḩalleh-ye Mollā Nāşafī, Molānā Şūfī, Mowlānā Şefī, and Mowlānā Sūfī) is a village in Jey Rural District, in the Central District of Isfahan County, Isfahan Province, Iran. At the 2006 census, its population was 37, in 10 families.

References 

Populated places in Isfahan County